The 2015 Colorado Buffaloes football team represented the University of Colorado at Boulder during the 2015 NCAA Division I FBS football season. Led by third-year head coach Mike MacIntyre, the Buffaloes played their home games on-campus at Folsom Field in Boulder and were members of the South Division of the Pac-12 Conference. They finished the season 4–9, 1–8 in Pac-12 play to finish in last place in the South Division.

Previous season
Colorado finished the 2014 season with a record of 2–10, 0–9 in Pac-12 play, and last place in the South Division.

Schedule

Game summaries

Hawaii

Massachusetts

Colorado State

Nicholls State

Oregon

Arizona State

Arizona

Oregon State

UCLA

Stanford

USC

Washington State

Utah

References

Colorado
Colorado Buffaloes football seasons
Colorado Buffaloes football